Route 320 is a short provincial route in New Brunswick, Canada that runs from Route 11 in Grande-Anse to an intersection with Route 303 in Maisonnette.

Communities
 Grande-Anse
 Anse-Bleue
 Maisonnette

See also
List of New Brunswick provincial highways

References

New Brunswick provincial highways
Roads in Gloucester County, New Brunswick